Traipu is a municipality located in the Brazilian state of Alagoas. Its population was 27,826 (2020) and its area is 698 km².

References

Municipalities in Alagoas